Irakli Kobakhidze (born 25 September 1978) is a Georgian politician, serving as Speaker of the Parliament of Georgia from 2016 to 2019 and serving as Member of Georgian Parliament since 2016.

He was the Executive Secretary and Political Council Member of the ruling party “Georgian Dream – Democratic Georgia”, Vice-President of the Parliamentary Assembly of the Council of Europe, Professor at the Tbilisi State University, former Chairman of the State Constitutional Commission and the author of the present Constitution of Georgia.

Biography
Kobakhidze graduated from the Law Faculty of the Tbilisi State University in 2000. Later, in 2002-2006, he advanced his legal education at the University of Dusseldorf, Germany, where he was awarded the LLM and PhD degrees.
Since 2006, Irakli Kobakhidze has worked with international organizations and academic institutions. For several years, he held expert and managerial positions at the United Nations Development Programme (UNDP). Simultaneously, he held academic positions at the Tbilisi State University and Caucasus University.

In 2015, Irakli Kobakhidze was appointed as Executive Secretary of the Georgian Dream party. On this position, he, together with Kakha Kaladze, the Secretary General of the party, implemented inner-party reforms mainly focused on strengthening regional structures and renewing the political team of the party. He was the deputy campaign manager for the 2016 parliamentary elections and the campaign manager for the 2017 municipal elections, thus playing an important role in the remarkable electoral success of the party in these years.

In 2017-2018, under his leadership, a wide-scale constitutional reform was implemented in Georgia. The new constitution established a European type parliamentary system of government. It divided competencies among different branches of government in accordance with the principle of separation of powers, introduced the proportional system of parliamentary elections, strengthened the role of the Parliament and the political rights of the opposition, advanced the constitutional guarantees of human rights, independence of the judiciary and local self-government, and stipulated EU and NATO integration as the constitutional task of all constitutional bodies.

Under Irakli Kobakhidze's leadership, the Parliament of Georgia strengthened its international ties – the Parliament was actively involved in the implementation of the non-recognition policy of the occupied regions of Georgia; the Parliamentary Assemblies of Georgia-Ukraine-Moldova and Georgia-Poland were established; strategic cooperation agreements were signed with a number of the Parliaments of the partner countries.

Irakli Kobakhidze made the decision to resign from the chairmanship when Russian Duma Deputy Sergei Gavrilov arbitrarily sat in the chair of the speaker of Parliament during the session of the Parliamentary Assembly of Orthodoxy at the plenary session hall of the Parliament of Georgia.
Currently, Irakli Kobakhidze is a Member of Parliament, Vice-President of PACE, Executive Secretary, Political Council Member and campaign manager of the Georgian Dream party, as well as Professor at the Law Faculty of the Tbilisi State University.

References

External links
 

1978 births
Politicians from Tbilisi
Speakers of the Parliament of Georgia
Georgian Dream politicians
Living people
Tbilisi State University alumni
Heinrich Heine University Düsseldorf alumni